The Portuguese Ambassador to the United Kingdom (known formally in the United Kingdom as Ambassador of the Portuguese Republic to the Court of St James's) is the official representative of the Portuguese Republic to the Queen and Government of the United Kingdom of Great Britain and Northern Ireland.

The Portuguese Embassy is located at 11 Belgrave Square, London.

The current ambassador is Manuel Lobo Antunes, who succeeded João de Vallera in 2016.

List of highest-ranking Portuguese envoys to Britain

Legation (1641–1924) 
The following list of heads of mission comes from the Diplomatic Institute of the Portuguese Ministry of Foreign Affairs.

References

 
Portugal
United Kingdom